Lily Bily is a 2018  Nepalese drama romance film, directed by Millan Chams. The film is produced by Govinda Shahi, and Sudip Khadka under the banner of Kafia Films. The film stars Pradeep Khadka, Priyanka Karki, Jassita Gurung, and Anoop Bikram Shahi in the lead roles.

Plot
Aabvash (Pradeep Khadka) and Shrutee (Jassita Gurung) two meet in Scotland, the both whom come from different backgrounds. Both of them start to look for their soul mate inside one another before falling on the love with them self's.

Cast
Pradeep Khadka as Aavash/Bily
Jassita Gurung as Shrutee/ Lily
Priyanka Karki
Anoop Bikram Shahi

Soundtrack

References

External links

Nepalese romantic drama films
Films set in Nepal
2018 romantic drama films